Karen Smithies  (born 20 March 1969) is a former England cricketer who played as a left-handed batter and right-arm medium bowler. She appeared in 15 Test matches and 69 One Day Internationals between 1986 and 2000, and was captain of England between 1993 and 2000. In 1993, she led England to their second World Cup title, and was the joint leading wicket-taker in the tournament. She played domestic cricket for East Midlands and Nottinghamshire. Following her playing career, Smithies has worked in South Africa, managing teams in their domestic competitions.

Smithies was appointed Officer of the Order of the British Empire (OBE) in the 1994 New Year Honours for services to ladies' cricket.

References

External links
 

1969 births
Living people
England women Test cricketers
England women One Day International cricketers
Officers of the Order of the British Empire
People from Ashby-de-la-Zouch
Cricketers from Leicestershire
East Midlands women cricketers
Nottinghamshire women cricketers